The Eschborn-Frankfurt City Loop U23 is a road bicycle race held annually in Germany. It is organized as a 1.2U event on the UCI Europe Tour, meaning it is reserved for under-23 riders.

Winners

References

UCI Europe Tour races
Cycle races in Germany
1998 establishments in Germany
Recurring sporting events established in 1998